The Women's Scratch Race event at the 2010 South American Games was held on March 20.

Medalists

Results

Distance: 40 laps (10 km)
Elapsed time: 14:10.863
Average Speed: 42.309 km/h

References
Report

Scratch W
Women's scratch